Paul Kpaka (born 7 August 1981) is a former Sierre Leonean footballer who played as a striker.

Early life 
Paul Kpaka was born into the Sherbro Rogers family in Kenema, the third largest city in Sierra Leone. He is a member of the famous Sherbro Kpaka or Rogers family originally from Bonthe District. Kpaka grew up in Kenema and Bo. He attended Bo School in Bo, Sierra Leone's second largest city. Kpaka who is commonly known by his nickname Senegal and was  considered the best secondary footballer in Sierra Leone. After he completed his secondary school education, his  hometown club, Kamboi Eagles of the Sierra Leone National Premier League signed him.

Club career

Germinal Beerschot 
In 2002, Belgian club Germinal Beerschot signed him from FC Brussels, whom he had joined after playing for various clubs in Sweden and Feyenoord in the Netherlands. During his first season in Belgium, Kpaka was the top scorer in the Jupiler League, hitting 28 league goals in the 2002–03 campaign. He was third at the Ebony Shoe Award, an award given to the top African footballer in Belgium. He signed for fellow Belgian club Genk for the next season.

Genk 
Kpaka was expected to lead Genk to the top two position in the Jupiler League, and take the club to the UEFA Champions League, but he suffered a cruciate ligament injury during the beginning of the season, which kept him out of football for six months. When he returned from injury, he could no longer secure a place in the starting eleven. He left the club in 2006–07 season and signed for another Belgian club Roeselare.

Return to GBA 
After two seasons for Roeselare, Kpaka returned to Germinal Beerschot in summer 2008. However, after two unsuccessful seasons, his contract was not renewed, and he will therefore leave Germinal Beerschot on 1 July 2010.

In Cyprus 
Kpaka finished his career with Cypriot clubs Enosis Neon Paralimni and Chalkanoras Idaliou in the Cyprus Division A.

International career 
Kpaka is a regular starter for Sierra Leone. He made his international debut for Sierra Leone in a 2004 African Nations Cup qualifier against Gabon on 12 October 2002. Sierra Leone won the match 2–0, with Kpaka scoring the first goal. Later on in the match, he got sent off for elbowing an opponent.

References

External links 

v-bal.nl

1981 births
Living people
Association football forwards
Sierra Leonean footballers
Sierra Leonean expatriate footballers
Cypriot First Division players
Belgian Pro League players
Eredivisie players
R.W.D.M. Brussels F.C. players
Beerschot A.C. players
K.R.C. Genk players
RBC Roosendaal players
K.S.V. Roeselare players
Sierra Leone international footballers
Expatriate footballers in Belgium
Sierra Leonean expatriate sportspeople in Belgium
Expatriate footballers in the Netherlands
Sierra Leonean expatriate sportspeople in the Netherlands
People from Kenema